This is a list of Games for Windows titles video games under Microsoft's Games for Windows label. With the closure of the Xbox.com PC marketplace in August 2013; no games were developed for the platform past 2013. The clients software and the servers are still available.

Released
This list contains  game titles on this list.

2006

2007

2008

2009

2010

2011

2012

2013

Notes

See also

Games for Windows
Games for Windows – Live
List of Games for Windows – Live titles
List of Windows Games on Demand
Live Anywhere

References

External links
 Games for Windows - Live
 

 
Video game lists by platform